Bedani, also known as Bedani Kalan, is a small village located in Tarhasi Block of Palamu District in the state of Jharkhand, India). It lies on the banks of the Amanat River some 30 km from the District town of Medininagar (Daltonganj)

Etymology 

According to a local legend, the village was established in 17th century CE, during the period of a sage called Gauri Ram Baba. The legend states that once a king's marriage party stopped at the site to rest during the course of their journey. Gauri Baba was passing by that place. Seeing the marriage party, he told the king about the probability of a Lightning Strike and asked them to move away from the place. As soon as the king's party moved away, the place was struck by lightning. The king was impressed by Gauri Baba and gifted him the site, along with 12 other villages in the vicinity. As a result, the village was named "bardani", Hindi for "received in gift". Over time, the name became "Bedani".

Infrastructure and places to visit 

Bedani has basic facilities like schools, primary healthcare centre, temples and markets. A large number of villagers moved out of the village in search of better job opportunities and higher education.

Bedani Mandir,

Tarhasi Mandir,

Tarhasi Bazaar Mandir,

Sati Mata Mandir, Bajari Bagi,

Tarhasi Block Office

Places nearby
Betla National Park- 42 Km from Bedani
Palamu Fort- 47 Km from Bedani

Notable people 

 Shri Subodh Kant Sahay, Member of the 14th Lok Sabha of India. He represents the Ranchi constituency of Jharkhand, and is a member of the Indian National Congress political party. His father Late Shri Brijdeo Sahay was the mukhiya (village chief) of Bedani.
 Late Shri Deo Nandan Pandey, Mukhiya (Village Chief) of Bedani after Late Shri Brij Deo Sahay, (From 1957 till 1993)
 Shri Gaurav Pandey, Head- Clean Energy and Energy Management, ClimateX. Founder of EnWagri. Founder of Gaurav Design and Consultancy. Former General Manager and Head of Operation of Mlinda Foundation's India Operations)

Demographics 

 census of India, the village has 143 resident families. The village has population of around 731 of which 383 are males while 348 are females. The population of children with age 0-6 is 102 which makes up 13.95% of total population. Average sex ratio is 909 (lower than Jharkhand's 948); the child sex ratio is 1217 (higher than Jharkhand's average of 948).

References

Villages in Palamu district